The Tamil  State Film Awards for Best Actor is given by the state government as part of its annual Tamil Nadu State Film Awards for Tamil  (Kollywood) films.

List of winners

See also
 Cinema of India

References

Actor